INFLIBNET Centre (Information and Library Network Centre) is an Inter-University Centre of the University Grants Commission (India) under the Ministry of Education (India). The organisation promotes and facilitates libraries and information resources for Indian further education. Its premises are in Gandhinagar, Gujarat.

Shodhganga, the digital repository of theses and dissertations submitted to universities in India is maintained by INFLIBNET Centre. INFLIBNET also performed an important role as an online learning resources by HRD Ministry during COVID-19 lockdown in India.

History

INFLIBNET is a major National Programme initiated by the University Grants Commission (India) in March 1991 as a project under the Inter-University Centre for Astronomy and Astrophysics (IUCAA). It became an independent Inter-University Centre in June 1996. INFLIBNET runs a nationwide high speed data network connecting university libraries and other information centres.

INFLIBNET is involved in modernizing university libraries in India using the state-of-art technologies for the optimum utilisation of information. In 2022, University Grants Commission (India) launched an initiative with the Information and Library Network (INFLIBNET) Centre to assist research scholars and their supervisors in conducting their research.

Activities

The Shodhganga portal of Inflibnet Centre displays the achievement of the competing universities with a detailed index of number of theses contributed by several departments of study. Calcutta University, Savitribai Phule Pune University and Aligarh Muslim University (AMU) have become largest contributors of theses to the Shodhganga portal of Inflibnet Centre.

The Centre leads projects for the development of library services in Indian universities. These have included:
 Financial support for automation of university libraries
 Development of a database of resources in libraries in India
 Development of a library management application named SOUL (Software for University Libraries)
 UGC-Infonet, an Internet connectivity programme

Open access initiatives include:
 OJAS, a platform for faculty and researchers in universities to host journals
 Shodhganga, a digital repository of theses and dissertations by research scholars in universities in India
 Shodhgangotri, a digital repository of synopses of research topics submitted to universities in India
 IR@INFLBNET, an repository of papers 
 Creation of R&D facilities and working groups to study and contribute to the open source movement
 Maintenance of a database of scientists, researchers and faculty members at academic institutions and organisations involved in teaching and research in India
 Bibliometric and scientometric studies 
 e-PG Pathshala, a gateway to Postgraduate courses
 Training courses in Library Management and Information and Communication Technology (ICT)

Publications
INFLIBNET publishes a quarterly newsletter and annual report which are distributed to the academic community across the country.

See also
 National Library of India

References

External links
INFLIBNET Centre Official Website

Further reading

Indian digital libraries
Libraries established in 1991